Henry Nolan Mettetal (November 19, 1945 – December 28, 2020) was an American politician from Mississippi.

Life and career
A member of the Republican party, Mettetal served as member of the Mississippi House of Representatives from the 10th District from 2012 to 2020. He previously served on the Mississippi Senate from 1996 to 2012.

He died from COVID-19 at Baptist Memorial Hospital of North Mississippi in Oxford, Mississippi, on December 28, 2020, aged 75.

References

External links
 Nolan Mettetal at Vote Smart

1945 births
2020 deaths
20th-century American politicians
21st-century American politicians
Deaths from the COVID-19 pandemic in Mississippi
Members of the Mississippi House of Representatives
Mississippi Democrats
Mississippi Republicans
Mississippi state senators
People from Sardis, Mississippi
Politicians from Baton Rouge, Louisiana
University of Mississippi alumni